Robin Lauwers (born 18 March 1999) is a Belgian professional footballer who plays as a midfielder.

Club career
Born in Turnhout, Lauwers began his career with Willem II before joining Eerste Divisie side Jong PSV in 2019. He made his professional debut for the club on 12 August 2019 against Den Bosch. He started in the 2–2 draw. Lauwers scored his first goal for the club on 27 September 2019 against Excelsior. His 63rd minute was not enough as Jong PSV were defeated 2–5.

On 29 October 2021, Lauwers signed with Danish 1st Division club Fremad Amager.

Career statistics

References

External links
Profile at the PSV website

1999 births
Living people
Sportspeople from Turnhout
Belgian footballers
Belgian expatriate footballers
Association football midfielders
Willem II (football club) players
K.V.C. Westerlo players
Jong PSV players
Fremad Amager players
Eerste Divisie players
Danish 1st Division players
Belgian expatriate sportspeople in the Netherlands
Belgian expatriate sportspeople in Denmark
Expatriate footballers in the Netherlands
Expatriate men's footballers in Denmark
Footballers from Antwerp Province